Pearce Young (December 24, 1918 - July 1984) served in the California State Assembly for the 5th district and during World War II he served in the United States Army.

References

External links
Join California Pearce Young

United States Army personnel of World War II
1918 births
1984 deaths
20th-century American politicians
Democratic Party members of the California State Assembly
People from Modesto, California